Geoffrey Robin Cheah (born 10 November 1990) is a Hong Kong competitive swimmer.

He qualified to the 2016 Summer Olympics in Rio de Janeiro, and was selected to represent Hong Kong in the men's 50 metre freestyle.

Early life
Cheah was born in the United Kingdom. His father is Taiwanese, while his mother is Malaysian. He attended West Island School in Hong Kong. While a student, he competed at British Swimming's Age Group Championships in 2005, where he won gold medals in the 100 metres backstroke and 200 metres backstroke and a silver in the 100 metres freestyle. He broke Hong Kong age group and junior records in all three events. He graduated from Stanford University in 2013 with a degree in earth systems.

References

1990 births
Living people
Hong Kong male freestyle swimmers
Olympic swimmers of Hong Kong
Swimmers at the 2016 Summer Olympics
Hong Kong people of Malaysian descent
Hong Kong people of Taiwanese descent
Stanford University alumni
Stanford Cardinal men's swimmers
Alumni of West Island School
Asian Games medalists in swimming
Swimmers at the 2006 Asian Games
Swimmers at the 2014 Asian Games
Medalists at the 2014 Asian Games
Asian Games bronze medalists for Hong Kong
21st-century Hong Kong people